Garret Joseph Anderson (born June 30, 1972) is an American former professional baseball left fielder. He played in Major League Baseball (MLB) for the California / Anaheim Angels / Los Angeles Angels of Anaheim, Atlanta Braves, and Los Angeles Dodgers between 1994 and 2010. He holds Angels franchise records for career games played (2,013), at bats (7,989), hits (2,368), runs scored (1,024), runs batted in (RBI) (1,292), total bases (3,743), extra base hits (796), singles (1,572), doubles (489), grand slams (8), RBI in a single game (10) and consecutive games with an RBI (12), as well as home runs by a left-handed hitter (272). A three-time All-Star, he helped lead the Angels to the 2002 World Series title, and was named Most Valuable Player of the 2003 All-Star Game.

High school career
Garret Anderson attended Kennedy High School in Granada Hills, California. While there, he was a three-sport star in baseball, football, and basketball. In baseball, he won two All-Los Angeles City honors and two All-League Honors, and as a junior, helped his team win the Los Angeles City Championship. In basketball, as a senior he won All-Los Angeles City honors and All-League honors.

Anaheim Angels
Anderson was selected by the California Angels in the fourth round of the 1990 MLB Draft and made his major league debut on July 27, 1994. He had two hits in four at bats in that game, recording his first career hit on a single to right field off of Oakland Athletics pitcher Ron Darling in the bottom of the third inning. He appeared in only five games with the Angels in 1994, getting five hits in 13 at bats.

In 1995, he was called up to the team on April 26 and spent the rest of the year in the majors. He hit his first career home run on June 13 against Kevin Tapani of the Minnesota Twins. He batted .321 in 106 games with 16 home runs and 69 RBIs, and finished second in the Rookie of the Year voting to Marty Cordova of the Twins. From that point forward, Anderson became a mainstay in the Angels lineup.

Over the next eight seasons, he accumulated at least 600 at bats every year, breaking 90 RBIs and 20 home runs five times while compiling a batting average near .300.

While Anderson hit a career-high 35 home runs in 2000, he drew few walks. He became only the second player to conclude a 30-homer season with more homers than walks (35 HR, 24 BB), joining Iván Rodríguez (35–24 in 1999); the dubious feat has since been duplicated by Alfonso Soriano (39–23 in 2002), Javy López (43–33 in 2003), José Guillén (31–24 in 2003), Joe Crede (30–28 in 2006) and Ryan Braun (34–29 in 2007).

In 2002, when the Angels won their first World Series championship, Anderson finished fourth in the Most Valuable Player voting after compiling a .306 average with 29 home runs and 123 runs batted in, including a 3-run double in the third inning of Game 7 which would turn out to be the series-winning hit. Anderson also scored a career-high 93 runs; however, the fact that he never scored 100 in a season was a result of his main weakness as a player – an inability to draw walks and achieve a high on-base percentage. Anderson had a similarly strong performance in 2003, and was named an American League All-Star. That All-Star weekend, he stole the show by becoming the Home Run Derby Champion and voted the Most Valuable Player in the All-Star Game, the first player to win both since Cal Ripken Jr. in 1991. In 2002 and 2003, Anderson tied for the American League lead in doubles with Nomar Garciaparra and Vernon Wells, respectively.

On April 13, 2004, Anderson agreed to a $48 million, four-year contract extension through 2008. The deal included a team option for 2009 with a $3 million buyout.

Anderson began experiencing chronic ailments in 2004 that limited his playing time and production, including an arthritic condition and plantar fasciitis in his feet. In , he began to see more regular time as a designated hitter to ease the wear and tear on his body. Anderson's production in 2006 was roughly on par with his 2005 production, with both seasons seeing him hit 17 home runs and drive in at least 85 runs.

On August 21, 2007, he drove in a team-record 10 runs, including a grand slam and a three-run homer, in the Los Angeles Angels' 18–9 win over the New York Yankees. Anderson became the 13th player in Major League history to have 10 RBIs in a game. Anderson now holds the team record for grand slams with eight and RBIs in a game with ten. This performance has been part of a general resurgence in the second half of the 2007 season, a relief to Angels fans who may have wondered if Anderson's career was near its end after a mediocre, injury-plagued first half. Instead, Anderson has led the majors in RBIs in the latter part of 2007. On September 7, Anderson drove in a run on an RBI single, to set a franchise record for most consecutive games with an RBI with 11. The streak lasted for 12 games, during which time he drove in 22 runs.

On October 28, 2008, the Angels announced they would decline their $14 million option on Anderson's contract and exercised a $3 million buyout.

Atlanta Braves

On February 24, 2009, Anderson agreed to a one-year deal with the Atlanta Braves for $2.5 million. On April 5, 2009, in the Braves' first game of the season, Anderson collected the 2,369th hit of his career, and the first he had with any franchise besides the Angels.

On July 2, 2009, Anderson hit the first career pinch-hit home run of his career.

On October 1, 2009, Anderson became the 89th player to reach 2,500 base hits, getting a single off of Washington Nationals pitcher Garrett Mock.

Los Angeles Dodgers
On March 3, 2010, Anderson agreed to a minor league deal with the Los Angeles Dodgers. He made the 25-man opening day roster as a reserve outfielder. In his first at bat with the Dodgers, he hit a pinch-hit single off Brendan Donnelly, his former Angels teammate. His first home run with the Dodgers came on April 22, when he hit a pinch-hit 2-run homer against the Cincinnati Reds.

Anderson was designated for assignment August 8, 2010 after hitting only .181 in 155 at bats, and was granted his release on August 10.

Retirement
On March 1, 2011, Anderson announced his retirement in a statement issued by the Angels.

As of 2012, Anderson is an Angels pregame and postgame reporter during home games and some road games on Fox Sports West, along with former teammate Tim Salmon.

He appeared on the ballot for the National Baseball Hall of Fame and Museum 2016 election and earned one vote.

In 2016, Anderson was inducted into the Angels' Hall of Fame.

Career Statistics

In the postseason, in 5 American League Division Series, 2 American League Championship Series and 1 World Series covering 36 games from 2002 to 2008, Anderson batted .245 (36-for-147) with 17 runs, 5 doubles, 1 triple, 5 home runs and 22 RBI.

Highlights

Awards
 Three-time All-Star (2002–2003, 2005)
 All-Star Game MVP (2003)
 The Sporting News Rookie of the Year (1995)
 Two-time Silver Slugger Award winner (2002–03)
 Top 10 in voting for MVP (2002, 4th)

Championships and accomplishments
 From 1997 to 2003, was second only to Derek Jeter in hits among all Major League players
 On the 2002 World Series championship team
 Won the Home Run Derby and All Star Game MVP known as the Ted Williams Award in 2003
 Led the American League in doubles in 2002 and 2003
 Holds the club record for RBIs (broke the old mark held by Tim Salmon in 2005)
 Holds the club-record for most RBI in a single game, 10 (August 21, 2007)
 Holds the club-record for most consecutive games with an RBI, 12 (September 7, 2007)
 Collected his 2,000th career hit on July 1, 2006.

See also

 List of Major League Baseball career home run leaders
 List of Major League Baseball doubles records
 List of Major League Baseball career hits leaders
 List of Major League Baseball career doubles leaders
 List of Major League Baseball career runs batted in leaders
 List of Major League Baseball career total bases leaders
 List of Major League Baseball annual doubles leaders
 List of Major League Baseball single-game hits leaders

References

External links

1972 births
Living people
Major League Baseball left fielders
California Angels players
Anaheim Angels players
Los Angeles Angels players
Atlanta Braves players
Los Angeles Dodgers players
American League All-Stars
Major League Baseball All-Star Game MVPs
Silver Slugger Award winners
Baseball players from Los Angeles
African-American baseball players
Arizona League Angels players
Boise Hawks players
Quad Cities Angels players
Palm Springs Angels players
Midland Angels players
Vancouver Canadians players
American expatriate baseball players in Canada
Rancho Cucamonga Quakes players
Sportspeople from Irvine, California
21st-century African-American sportspeople
20th-century African-American sportspeople